Nelson P. Boyer Barn was a historic barn located at East Fallowfield Township, Chester County, Pennsylvania.  It was built in 1894, and was a 60 feet by 70 feet, wood-frame structure in the Late Gothic Revival style. It was built to stable 100 head of stock for stock breeding.  It was known at the turn of the 20th century as the "Showplace of Chester County," and was used by Buffalo Bill as winter quarters and practice.

In 1990, the barn was deteriorating rapidly and plans were made to disassemble it and sell it to antique dealer Randy Hilgert of Madison, Connecticut.

It was added to the National Register of Historic Places in 1985, and delisted in 1991 after demolition.

References

Barns on the National Register of Historic Places in Pennsylvania
Buildings and structures in Chester County, Pennsylvania
Gothic Revival architecture in Pennsylvania
Infrastructure completed in 1894
National Register of Historic Places in Chester County, Pennsylvania